Jake Fraser-McGurk (born 11 April 2002) is an Australian cricketer. He made his first-class debut on 12 November 2019, for Victoria in the 2019–20 Sheffield Shield season. He made his List A debut on 17 November 2019, for Victoria in the 2019–20 Marsh One-Day Cup. He scored a fifty on both his first-class and List A debut.

In December 2019, he was named in Australia's squad for the 2020 Under-19 Cricket World Cup. However, he had to leave the tournament early, after being scratched by a monkey during a team trip to a nature reserve.

He made his Twenty20 debut on 12 December 2020, for the Melbourne Renegades, in the 2020–21 Big Bash League season.

References

External links
 

2002 births
Living people
Australian cricketers
Victoria cricketers
Melbourne Renegades cricketers
Place of birth missing (living people)